Johan Bernhard Hjort (25 February 1895 – 24 February 1969) was a Norwegian supreme court lawyer. Having joined the law firm of Harald Nørregaard in 1932, he continued the firm after World War II as Advokatfirmaet Hjort, which today is one of Norway's leading law firms. Hjort was also noted for his involvement with the fascist party, Nasjonal Samling, in the 1930s, but left the party in 1937 and became an active member of the anti-Nazi resistance during World War II. He was imprisoned by the Nazis and is credited with saving the lives of many prisoners through his involvement with the White Buses. After World War II, he rose to become one of Norway's preeminent lawyers, and was noted for his defence of gay rights and controversial artists, as chairman of the Riksmålsforbundet language society, and as a liberal public figure.

Background

He was the son of marine biologist, oceanographer, and director of fisheries, Johan Hjort.

Political involvement in the 1930s

On 17 May (Norway's annual celebratory holiday) 1933, with Vidkun Quisling he founded the Nasjonal Samling, a political party based on Germany's Nazi Party. He and Quisling devised a programme of mostly very right-wing policies that included the outlawing of revolutionary parties (such as those funded by foreign bodies like Comintern), the suspension of the voting rights for people in receipt of social welfare, agricultural debt relief and an audit of public finances. Hjort became leader of the Hirden, the paramilitary wing of the Nasjonal Samling party that was modeled on the German Sturmabteilung, the Nazi "Brownshirts". In 1937 Hjort broke with Quisling and left Nasjonal Samling.

Resistance during World War II

After the German occupation in 1940, Hjort held lectures in the German-controlled Norwegian Broadcasting Corporation, alongside individuals like Albert Wiesener, Jonas Lie, and Ranik Halle. He was arrested by the Gestapo in 1941 on the orders of Josef Terboven, the German Reichskommissar for Norway, after Hjort published a scholarly article in a journal of Norwegian law that openly criticised the German occupation.  He was imprisoned, first in Oslo and then in Berlin. After being released, Hjort and his family carried out important resistance work in Germany, playing a crucial role in the first stages of the White Buses operation.  It is estimated that this operation saved 15,345 prisoners from death in concentration and prisoner camps; of these, 7,795 were Scandinavian. In particular, 423 Danish Jews were saved from the Theresienstadt concentration camp inside German-occupied territory of Czechoslovakia, contributing significantly to the fact that the casualties among Danish Jews during the Holocaust were among the lowest of the occupied countries of Europe.

Post-war career

After the war, Hjort fought as a supreme court lawyer for the artistic freedom of controversial artists and for the natural legal rights of homosexuals. In 1957, in one of the most famous and widely debated court cases in Norwegian post-war history, Hjort was the defense lawyer for novelist Agnar Mykle, who was accused of immoral and obscene writing in his books. Hjort was a long-term leader of Riksmålsforbundet, an association that fought for the free evolution of the Norwegian language, in the direction of Riksmål. He was a prolific writer and lecturer and a frequent contributor to public debate. Among his books are Justismord (1952), Dømt med rette? (1958), and Demokrati og statsmakt (1963). He also translated Kipling's Just So Stories into Norwegian.

See also 
Wanda Hjort Heger, Hjort's eldest daughter

References 

 Ivo de Figueiredo (2002): Fri mann, Aschehoug  (Free Man, in Norwegian); a biography of Hjort that won the Brage Prize (comparable in Norway to a Pulitzer Prize)
 Wanda Hjort Heger (1984): Hver fredag foran porten, Gyldendal  (Every Friday at the gate, in Norwegian), German edition (1989) Jeden Freitag vor dem Tor Schneekluth ; Hjort's daughter's story about the war years, the tracking down of concentration camps, and the planning and execution of the White Buses operation that successfully saved thousands of prisoners from the camps
 Erling Kvamme (2007): The Bernadotte Operation, in the light of Johan Bernhard Hjort's forgotten role as its initiator (in Norwegian); Historie 1-07, pp. 34–39.

External links 
The Hjort law firm

1895 births
1969 deaths
Members of Nasjonal Samling
Norwegian resistance members
20th-century Norwegian lawyers
Nazi concentration camp survivors
Norwegian LGBT rights activists
World War II civilian prisoners